Christopher D'Olier Reeve (September 25, 1952 – October 10, 2004) was an American actor, film director, author, and activist, best known for playing the title character in the film Superman (1978) and three sequels.

Born in New York City and raised in Princeton, New Jersey, Reeve discovered a passion for acting and the theater at the age of nine. He studied at Cornell University and the Juilliard School and made his Broadway debut in 1976. After his acclaimed performances in Superman and Superman II, Reeve declined many roles in action movies, choosing instead to work in small films and plays with more complex characters. He later appeared in critically successful films such as The Bostonians (1984), Street Smart (1987), and The Remains of the Day (1993), and in the plays Fifth of July on Broadway and The Aspern Papers in London's West End.

On May 27, 1995, Reeve broke his neck when he was thrown from a horse during an equestrian competition in Culpeper, Virginia. The injury paralyzed him from the shoulders down, and he used a wheelchair and ventilator for the rest of his life. Reeve returned to creative work, directing In the Gloaming (1997) and acting in the television remake of Rear Window (1998). He also made several appearances in the Superman-themed television series Smallville, and wrote two autobiographical books, Still Me and Nothing is Impossible. Over the course of his career, Reeve received a BAFTA Award, a Screen Actors Guild Award, an Emmy Award, and a Grammy Award.

Beginning in the 1980s, Reeve was an activist for environmental and human-rights causes and for artistic freedom of expression. After his accident, he lobbied for spinal injury research, including human embryonic stem cell research, and for better insurance coverage for people with disabilities. His advocacy work included leading the Christopher and Dana Reeve Foundation and co-founding the Reeve-Irvine Research Center. Reeve died on October 10, 2004.

Early life and education
Reeve was born on September 25, 1952, in New York City, the son of Barbara Pitney Lamb, a journalist; and Franklin D'Olier Reeve (1928–2013), a teacher, novelist, poet, and scholar. Many of his ancestors had been in America since the early 17th century, some having been aboard the Mayflower. Other ancestors of Reeve came from the French aristocracy. His paternal grandfather, Colonel Richard Henry Reeve, had been the CEO of Prudential Financial (when it was called Prudential Life Insurance Company) for over 25 years.

Franklin and Barbara divorced in 1956, and she moved with Christopher and his younger brother to Princeton, New Jersey, where they attended Nassau Street School and then Princeton Country Day School (today called the Princeton Day School). Reeve's parents both remarried. Reeve excelled academically, athletically, and onstage; he was on the honor roll and played soccer, baseball, tennis, and hockey. The sportsmanship award at Princeton Day School's invitational hockey tournament was named in Reeve's honor.

Reeve had a difficult relationship with his father, Franklin. He wrote in 1998 that his father's "love for his children always seemed tied to performance" and he put pressure on himself to act older than he actually was in order to gain his father's approval. Between 1988 and 1995 the two barely spoke to each other, but they reconciled after Reeve's paralyzing accident.

Reeve found his passion for acting in 1962 at age nine when he was cast in an amateur version of the operetta The Yeomen of the Guard; it was the first of many student plays. His interest was solidified when at age fifteen, he spent a summer as an apprentice at the Williamstown Theatre Festival in Williamstown, Massachusetts.

Cornell
After graduating from Princeton Day School in June 1970, Reeve acted in plays in Boothbay, Maine. He planned to go to New York City to find a career in theater. Ultimately, however, at the advice of his mother, he applied for college. He was accepted into Princeton University, Columbia University, Brown University, Cornell University, Northwestern University, and Carnegie Mellon University. Reeve said he chose Cornell primarily because it was distant from New York City and this would help him avoid the temptation of working as an actor immediately versus finishing college, as he had promised his mother and stepfather. Reeve joined the theater department in Cornell and played Pozzo in Waiting for Godot, Segismundo in Life Is a Dream, Hamlet in Rosencrantz and Guildenstern Are Dead, and Polixenes in The Winter's Tale.

Late in his freshman year, Reeve received a letter from Stark Hesseltine, a high-powered New York City agent who had discovered Robert Redford and who represented actors such as Richard Chamberlain, Michael Douglas, and Susan Sarandon. Hesseltine had seen Reeve in A Month in the Country and wanted to represent him. Reeve was very excited and kept re-reading the letter to make sure of what it said. Reeve was impatient with school and anxious to get on with his career. The two met, but Reeve was surprised to find Hesseltine strongly supported his promise to his mother and stepfather to complete college. They decided instead of dropping out of school, Reeve would come to New York once a month to meet casting agents and producers to find work for the summer vacation.

Reeve received favorable responses to his introductions and auditions arranged by Hesseltine but had to forgo several desirable opportunities because they began before school ended. In the summer, he toured in a production of Forty Carats with Eleanor Parker. The next year, Reeve received a full summer contract with the San Diego Shakespeare Festival, with roles as Edward IV in Richard III, Fenton in The Merry Wives of Windsor, and Dumaine in Love's Labour's Lost at the Old Globe Theatre.

Before his third year of college, Reeve took a three-month leave of absence. He traveled to Glasgow, Scotland, and saw theatrical productions throughout the United Kingdom. He was inspired by the actors there, and often had conversations with them in bars after their performances. He helped actors at the Old Vic with their American accents by reading the newspaper aloud for them. He then flew to Paris to study the French theater. Reeve spoke fluent French, having studied it from the third grade through his first year in Cornell. While there he spoke only French to immerse himself in French culture, and watched many performances before returning to New York to reunite with his girlfriend.

Juilliard
After returning to the US from Europe, Reeve chose to focus solely on acting, although Cornell had several general education requirements for graduation he had yet to complete. He managed to convince theater director Jim Clause and the dean of the College of Arts and Sciences, as a theater major, he would achieve more at Juilliard (Group 4, 1973–1975) in New York City than at Cornell. They agreed his first year at Juilliard would be counted as his senior year at Cornell.

In 1973, approximately 2,000 students auditioned for 20 places in the freshman class at Juilliard. Reeve's audition was in front of 10 faculty members, including John Houseman, who had just won an Academy Award for The Paper Chase. Reeve and Robin Williams were the only students selected for Juilliard's Advanced Program. They had several classes together in which they were the only students. In their dialects class with Edith Skinner, Williams had no trouble mastering all dialects naturally, whereas Reeve was more meticulous about it. Williams and Reeve developed a close friendship.

In a meeting with Houseman, Reeve was told, "Mr. Reeve. It is terribly important that you become a serious classical actor. Unless, of course, they offer you a shitload of money to do something else." Houseman then offered him the chance to leave school and join the Acting Company, among performers such as Kevin Kline, Patti LuPone, and David Ogden Stiers. Reeve declined, as he had not yet received his bachelor's degree.

In early 1974, Reeve and other Juilliard students toured the New York City junior high school system and performed The Love Cure. In one performance, Reeve, who played the hero, drew his sword out too high and accidentally destroyed a row of lights above him. The students applauded and cheered. Reeve later said this was the greatest ovation of his career. After completing his first year at Juilliard, Reeve graduated from Cornell in the Class of 1974 with a Bachelor of Arts degree.

Career

Early career
In late 1975, Reeve auditioned for the Broadway play A Matter of Gravity. Katharine Hepburn watched his audition and cast him as her character's grandson in the play. With Hepburn's influence over the CBS network, Reeve worked out the schedules of the soap opera Love of Life and the play so he would be able to do both. Because of his busy schedule, he ate candy bars and drank coffee in place of meals and experienced exhaustion and malnutrition. On the first night of the play's run, Reeve entered the stage, said his first line, and then promptly fainted. Hepburn turned to the audience and said, "This boy's a goddamn fool. He doesn't eat enough red meat." The understudy finished the play for Reeve, and a doctor treated him. The doctor advised Reeve to eat a healthier diet. He stayed with the play throughout its year-long run and was given very favorable reviews.

Reeve and Hepburn became very close. She said, "You're going to be a big star, Christopher, and support me in my old age." Some gossip columns rumored a romance between the two. Reeve said, "She was 67 and I was 22, but I thought that was quite an honor ... I believe I was fairly close to what a child or grandchild might have been to her." Reeve said his father, who was a professor of literature and came to many of the performances, was the man who most captivated Hepburn. When the play moved to Los Angeles in 1976, Reeve—to Hepburn's disappointment—dropped out. They stayed in touch for years after the play's run. Reeve later regretted not staying closer and just sending messages back and forth.

Reeve's first role in a Hollywood film was a very small part as a junior officer in the 1978 naval submarine disaster movie Gray Lady Down, starring Charlton Heston. He then acted in the play My Life at the Circle Repertory Company with friend William Hurt.

Superman

During My Life, Stark Hesseltine told Reeve he had been asked to audition for the leading role as Clark Kent/Superman in the big budget film Superman (1978). Lynn Stalmaster, the casting director, put Reeve's picture and résumé on the top of the pile three separate times, only to have the producers throw it out each time. Through Stalmaster's persistent pleading, a meeting between director Richard Donner, producer Ilya Salkind, and Reeve was arranged. The morning after the meeting, Reeve was sent a 300-page script. He was thrilled the script took the subject matter seriously, and Donner's motto was verisimilitude. Reeve flew to London for a screen test, and on the way was told Marlon Brando was going to play Jor-El and Gene Hackman was going to play Lex Luthor. Reeve still did not think he had much of a chance. On the plane ride to London, he imagined how his approach to the role would be. He later said, "By the late 1970s, the masculine image had changed ... Now it was acceptable for a man to show gentleness and vulnerability. I felt that the new Superman ought to reflect that contemporary male image." He based his portrayal of Clark Kent on Cary Grant in his role in Bringing Up Baby. After the screen test, his driver said, "I'm not supposed to tell you this, but you've got the part."

Portraying Superman would be a stretch for the 24-year-old actor. Reeve went through an intense two-month training regimen with former British weightlifting champion David Prowse supervising. The training regimen consisted of running in the morning, followed by two hours of weightlifting and 90 minutes on the trampoline. He added  of muscle to his "thin"  frame. He later made even higher gains for Superman III (1983), though for Superman IV: The Quest for Peace (1987), he decided it would be healthier to focus more on cardiovascular workouts. One of the reasons Reeve could not work out as much for Superman IV was an emergency appendectomy he had in June 1986.

Reeve was never a Superman or comic book fan, though he had watched Adventures of Superman starring George Reeves. Reeve found the role offered a suitable challenge because it was a dual role. He said, "there must be some difference stylistically between Clark and Superman. Otherwise, you just have a pair of glasses standing in for a character."

On the commentary track for the director's edition of Superman II: The Richard Donner Cut, creative consultant Tom Mankiewicz spoke of how Reeve had talked to him about playing Superman and then playing Clark Kent. Mankiewicz then corrected Reeve, telling him he was "always, always playing Superman" and when he was Clark Kent, he was "playing Superman who was playing Clark Kent." Mankiewicz described it to Reeve as a role within a role.

The film, made without the use of computers for special effects, was the first attempt to realistically show a person flying. Roy Field, the film's optical supervisor, said, "There were many techniques used to make Superman fly, but the best special effect of all was Christopher Reeve himself. We discovered very early on he, being a glider pilot, could hold his body aerodynamically. So when he got into the harness, the whole shot began to come alive."

The film grossed $300.2 million worldwide (unadjusted for inflation). Reeve received positive reviews for his performance:
 "Christopher Reeve's entire performance is a delight. Ridiculously good-looking, with a face as sharp and strong as an ax blade, his bumbling, fumbling Clark Kent and omnipotent Superman are simply two styles of gallantry and innocence." – Newsweek
 "Christopher Reeve has become an instant international star on the basis of his first major movie role, of Clark Kent/Superman. Film reviewers—regardless of their opinion of the film—have been almost unanimous in their praise of Reeve's dual portrayal. He is utterly convincing as he switches back and forth between personae." – Starlog

For his performance, Reeve won a BAFTA Award for Most Promising Newcomer to Leading Film Roles. Reeve described Superman as "the closest opportunity I've had to playing a classical role on film, the closest expression to something of mythical dimension." His co-star Margot Kidder said after his death with the Superman films, Reeve "knew he'd done something meaningful. He was very aware of that and very happy with that role."

Reeve used his celebrity status for several philanthropic causes. Through the Make-A-Wish Foundation, he visited terminally ill children. He joined the board of directors for the worldwide charity Save the Children. In 1979, he served as a track and field coach at the Special Olympics alongside O. J. Simpson.

Sequels
Much of Superman II was filmed at the same time as the first film. In fact, the original plan had been for the film to be a single three-hour epic comprising both parts. After most of the footage had been shot, the producers had a disagreement with director Richard Donner over various matters, including money and special effects, and they mutually agreed to part ways. Director Richard Lester, who had worked with the producers previously on the two-parter The Three Musketeers (1973) and The Four Musketeers (1974), replaced Donner. Lester had the script changed and re-shot some footage. The cast was unhappy, but Reeve later said he liked Lester and considered Superman II to be his favorite of the series. Richard Donner's version of Superman II, titled Superman II: The Richard Donner Cut, was released on DVD in November 2006 and was dedicated in memory of Reeve.

Lester directed Superman III, released in 1983, solo. Reeve believed the producers Alexander Salkind, his son Ilya Salkind, and Pierre Spengler decreased the credibility of Superman III by turning it into a Richard Pryor comedy, hence making it a not very good film. He missed Donner and believed Superman III only really good element was the automobile junkyard scene in which Evil Superman fights Good Clark Kent in an internal battle. Reeve's portrayal of the Evil Superman was highly praised, though the film was critically panned. Any negative review for Superman III, however, was nothing compared to the totally negative reception its successor would receive.

Superman IV: The Quest for Peace was released in 1987. After Superman III, Reeve vowed he was done with Superman. However, he agreed to continue the role in a fourth film on the condition he would have partial creative control over the script. The nuclear disarmament plot was his idea. Cannon Films purchased the production rights to the character of Superman from Alexander Salkind and his son Ilya Salkind, the original producers of the film series, in the mid-1980s. Cannon Films were known for low-budget, poorly-acted, poorly-scripted action films. They cut the budget of Superman IV in half to $17 million. The film was both a critical failure and a box-office disappointment, becoming the lowest-grossing Superman film to date. Reeve later said, "the less said about Superman IV the better." Both of Reeve's children from his relationship with Gae Exton had uncredited appearances in a deleted scene in which Superman rescues a girl, played by his daughter Alexandra, and reunites her with her brother, played by his son Matthew, after Nuclear Man creates a tornado in Smallville.

Reeve would have made a fifth Superman film after the rights to the character reverted to Alexander Salkind, Ilya Salkind, and Pierre Spengler if the film had a budget the same size as of Superman: The Movie. Although there was potential for such a film in the late 1980s after Cannon Films went bankrupt, Reeve never received any script.

In 1993, two years before Reeve's accident, the Salkinds sold the rights to the character of Superman again, this time to Warner Bros. "There was supposed to be a fifth Superman movie titled Superman Reborn, but because of studio shifts, the terrible box office [Superman IV] got, and ... Reeves's  accident, it never saw the light of day."

1980–1986

Reeve's first role after 1978's Superman was in the 1980 time-travel mystery/romantic fantasy Somewhere in Time. Reeve as Richard Collier romanced actress Elise McKenna, a popular stage actress from the early 20th century, played by Jane Seymour. The film was shot on Mackinac Island using the Grand Hotel in mid-1979, and was Reeve's favorite film to shoot.

After the film was completed, the plan was for a limited release and to build word of mouth, but early test screenings were favorable and the studio decided on a wide release, which proved to be the wrong strategy. Early reviews savaged the film as unduly sentimental and melodramatic, and an actors' strike prevented Reeve and Seymour from doing publicity. The film quickly closed, although Jean-Pierre Dorléac was nominated for an Academy Award for Best Costume Design in 1980. The film, commercially unsuccessful, was Reeve's first public disappointment. However, almost ten years after Somewhere in Time was released, at a time when other period films were beginning to be made, it became a cult film favorite, thanks to screenings on cable networks and video rentals; its popularity began to grow, vindicating the belief of the creative team. INSITE, the International Network of Somewhere in Time Enthusiasts, did fundraising to sponsor a star on the Hollywood Walk of Fame in 1997 for Reeve. Jane Seymour became a friend of Reeve and in 1996 named one of her twin sons Kristopher in his honor. The Grand Hotel and Mackinac Island has become a popular tourist site for film fans.

In that same year, Reeve made a guest appearance on The Muppet Show, where he performed "East of the Sun (and West of the Moon)" on a piano for Miss Piggy, who had a crush on him. Reeve denied being Superman but displayed the character's superpowers throughout the episode. He then returned to continue filming on the not yet finished production of Superman II.

After finishing Superman II, Reeve and his family left London and rented a house in the Hollywood Hills. Soon after, Reeve grew tired of Hollywood and took the family to Williamstown, Massachusetts, where he played the lead in the successful play The Front Page, directed by Robert Allan Ackerman. Later in the year, Reeve played a disabled Vietnam veteran in Lanford Wilson's play Fifth of July on Broadway to excellent reviews. To prepare for the role, he was coached by an amputee on how to walk on artificial legs.

In 1982 Reeve stretched his acting range further and played a devious novice playwright with questionable motives regarding his lover and mentor Michael Caine, in Sidney Lumet's suspenseful dark comedy film Deathtrap, based on the play by Ira Levin. The film was well received. The same year, Reeve portrayed corrupt Catholic priest John Flaherty making challenging decisions during World War II in Monsignor. Reeve felt this gave him the opportunity to play "a morally ambiguous character who was neither clearly good nor clearly bad, someone to whom life is much more complex than the characters I've played previously". Reeve blamed the failure of the film on poor editing. He said "the movie is sort of a series of outrageous incidents that you find hard to believe. Since they don't have a focus, and since they aren't justified and explained, they become laughable".

Reeve was then offered the role of Basil Ransom in 1984's The Bostonians alongside Vanessa Redgrave. Though Reeve ordinarily commanded over one million dollars per film, the producers could only afford to pay him one-tenth of that. Reeve had no complaints, as he was happy to be doing a role of which he could be proud. The film exceeded expectations and performed well at the box office for what was considered to be an art house film. The New York Times called it "the best adaptation of a literary work yet made for the screen." Katharine Hepburn called Reeve to tell him he was "absolutely marvelous" and "captivating" in the film. When he told her he was currently shooting the 1985 version of Anna Karenina, she said, "Oh, that's a terrible mistake."

Reeve was a licensed pilot and flew solo across the Atlantic twice. During the filming of Superman III, he raced his sailplane in his free time. He joined The Tiger Club, a group of aviators who had served in the Royal Air Force in the Battle of Britain. They let him participate in mock dogfights in vintage World War I combat planes. The producers of the film The Aviator approached him without knowing he was a pilot and he knew how to fly a Stearman, the plane used in the film. Reeve readily accepted the role. The film was shot in Kranjska Gora, and Reeve performed all his own stunts.

In 1984, Reeve appeared in The Aspern Papers with Vanessa Redgrave. He then played Tony in The Royal Family and the Count in a modern adaptation of the play The Marriage of Figaro.

In 1985, Reeve hosted the television documentary Dinosaur! Fascinated with dinosaurs since he was a child, as he says in the documentary, he flew himself to New York in his own plane to shoot on location at the American Museum of Natural History. Also, in 1985, DC Comics named Reeve as one of the honorees in the company's 50th-anniversary publication Fifty Who Made DC Great for his work on the Superman film series.

In 1986, he was still struggling to find scripts he liked. A script named Street Smart had been lying in his house for years, and after re-reading it, he had Cannon Films green-light it. He starred opposite Morgan Freeman, who was nominated for his first Academy Award for the film. The film received excellent reviews but performed poorly at the box office, possibly because Cannon Films had failed to properly advertise it.

1987–1989
After the filming of Superman IV in February 1987, Reeve and Exton separated and Reeve returned to New York. In June, he appeared in the British television special charity event The Grand Knockout Tournament. In a depression without his children, aged seven and three, he decided doing a comedy might be good for him. He was given a lead in Switching Channels. Burt Reynolds and Kathleen Turner had a feud during filming, which made the time even more unbearable for Reeve. Reeve later stated he made a fool of himself in the film and most of his time was spent refereeing between Reynolds and Turner. The film did poorly, and Reeve believed it marked the end of his movie star career. He spent the next years mostly doing plays. He auditioned for the Richard Gere role in Pretty Woman but walked out on the audition because they had a half-hearted casting director fill in for Julia Roberts.

In the late 1980s, Reeve became more active. He was taking horse-riding lessons and trained five to six days a week for competition in combined training events. He built a sailboat, The Sea Angel, and sailed from the Chesapeake to Nova Scotia.

1990–1995
In 1990, Reeve starred in the American Civil War film The Rose and the Jackal, in which he played Allan Pinkerton, the head of President Lincoln's new Secret Service. In October, Reeve was offered the part of Lewis in The Remains of the Day. The script was one of the best he had read, and he unhesitatingly took the part. The film was deemed an instant classic and was nominated for eight Academy Awards.

In 1992, Reeve played a lead role in the movie comedy Noises Off, in which he played a character named Frederick Dallas.

In the early 1990s, Reeve was in three roles for television in which he was cast as a villain. The most notable of these was Bump in the Night, in which Reeve played a child molester who abducts a young boy in New York City. The movie received fair to positive reviews. Reeve felt it was important for parents of young children to see the film. In another television movie, Mortal Sins (1992), Reeve for the second time played a Catholic priest, this time hearing the confessions of a serial murderer in a role reminiscent of Montgomery Clift in Hitchcock's I Confess.

In the 1990s, Reeve received scripts for Picket Fences and Chicago Hope and was asked by CBS if he wanted to start his own television series. This would have meant moving to Los Angeles, which would place him even further from his children, who lived in London. In Massachusetts, Reeve could take a Concorde and see them at any time. He declined the offers. Reeve did not object to all long-distance journeys; he went to New Mexico to shoot Speechless, co-starring Michael Keaton. Reeve then went to Point Reyes to shoot John Carpenter's film Village of the Damned, a remake of a 1960 British movie of the same name. Both of the films with this title were based on the 1957 novel The Midwich Cuckoos by John Wyndham.

Shortly before his accident, Reeve played a paralyzed police officer in the HBO movie Above Suspicion. He did research at a rehabilitation hospital in Van Nuys and learned how to use a wheelchair to get in and out of cars. His injury occurred less than a week after the premiere of the film.

In 1995, Reeve was offered the lead in Kidnapped. He also planned to direct his first big screen film, a romantic comedy entitled Tell Me True. Both plans were cancelled as a result of the horseback riding accident in 1995 that left him paralyzed.

1996–2004
In 1996, Reeve narrated the HBO film Without Pity: A Film About Abilities. The film won the Emmy Award for "Outstanding Informational Special". He then acted in a small role in the film A Step Toward Tomorrow.

In 1997, Reeve made his directorial debut with the HBO film In the Gloaming with Robert Sean Leonard, Glenn Close, Whoopi Goldberg, Bridget Fonda, and David Strathairn. The film won four Cable Ace Awards and was nominated for five Emmy Awards including "Outstanding Director for a Miniseries or Special". Dana Reeve said, "There's such a difference in his outlook, his health, his overall sense of well-being when he's working at what he loves, which is creative work." In 1998, Reeve produced and starred in Rear Window, a remake of Alfred Hitchcock's 1954 film. He was nominated for a Golden Globe and won a Screen Actors Guild Award for his performance.

On April 25, 1998, Random House published Reeve's autobiography, Still Me. The book spent eleven weeks on the New York Times Best Seller list and Reeve won a Grammy Award for Best Spoken Word Album. In 2000, he made guest appearances on the long-running PBS series Sesame Street.

On February 25, 2003, Reeve appeared in the television series Smallville as Dr. Virgil Swann in the episode "Rosetta". In the episode, Dr. Swann brings to Clark Kent (Tom Welling) information about where he comes from and how to use his powers for the good of mankind. The scenes of Reeve and Welling feature music cues from 1978's Superman: The Movie, composed by John Williams and arranged by Mark Snow. At the end of this episode, Reeve and Welling appeared in a short spot inviting people to support the Christopher Reeve Paralysis Foundation. "Rosetta" set ratings history for The WB. The fan community met the episode with rave reviews and praised it as being among the series' best to this day. Reeve also appeared in the Smallville episode "Legacy", in which he met again with fellow stage actor John Glover, who played Lionel Luthor in the show.

In April 2002, Random House published Reeve's second book, Nothing Is Impossible. This book is shorter than Still Me and focuses on Reeve's world views and the life experiences helped him shape them. Also, in 2004, Reeve directed the A&E film The Brooke Ellison Story. The film is based on the true story of Brooke Ellison, the first quadriplegic to graduate from Harvard University. Reeve during this time was directing the animated film Everyone's Hero. It was one of his dream projects and he died during the middle of production for the film. His wife Dana helped out, and his son Will was a cast member in the film. Dana and Will also had small roles in The Brooke Ellison Story.

Roles turned down by Reeve
Following the first Superman movie, Reeve realized Hollywood producers wanted him to be an action star. He later said, "I found most of the scripts of the genre poorly constructed, and I felt the starring roles could easily be played by anyone with a strong physique." In addition, he did not feel he was right for the other films he was offered and turned down the lead roles in American Gigolo, The World According to Garp, Splash, Fatal Attraction, Romancing the Stone, Lethal Weapon, and Body Heat. Katharine Hepburn recommended Reeve to David Lean for the role of Fletcher Christian in The Bounty, a film version of Mutiny on the Bounty starring Anthony Hopkins. After considering it, Reeve decided he would be miscast, and the film was eventually made with Mel Gibson. After his 1995 accident, Reeve turned down the role of Mason Verger in Hannibal, which was played by Gary Oldman.

Personal life

Relationships
While filming the first two Superman movies in England, Reeve began a ten-year relationship with modeling executive Gae Exton. They had a son, Matthew Exton Reeve, on December 20, 1979, and a daughter, Alexandra Exton Reeve, in December 1983. Both were born in London, England. In February 1987, Reeve and Gae Exton separated amicably with joint custody of their children, and Reeve returned to New York. Matthew and Alexandra remained in London with their mother and often spent their holidays with Reeve.

In June 1987, Reeve met his future wife Dana Morosini, a singer and actress. By 1991, they were living together but Reeve, remembering his parents' painful divorce and other failed marriages in his family, could not bring himself to commit. After they almost broke up, Reeve began about a year of therapy, primarily to talk through his fears about marriage. Then one night during dinner, he said "I just put down my fork and asked her to marry me." They were married in April 1992, and their son William was born on June 7, 1992. The couple remained happily married until Reeve's death.

Equestrianism and injury
Reeve began his involvement in horse riding in 1985 after learning to ride for the film Anna Karenina. He was initially allergic to horses, so he took antihistamines. He trained on Martha's Vineyard, and by 1989, he began eventing. His allergies soon disappeared. He had leg injuries as a teen while skiing, and he later broke three ribs in a riding accident he described, along with the leg injuries, on The Tonight Show in March 1987.

Reeve purchased a 12-year-old American thoroughbred horse named Eastern Express, nicknamed "Buck" while filming Village of the Damned. He trained with Buck in 1994 and planned to do Training Level events in 1995 and move up to Preliminary in 1996. Though Reeve had originally signed up to compete at an event in Vermont, his coach invited him to go to the Commonwealth Dressage and Combined Training Association finals at the Commonwealth Park equestrian center in Culpeper, Virginia. Reeve finished in fourth place out of 27 in the dressage, before walking his cross-country course. He was concerned about jumps 16 and 17 but paid little attention to the third jump, which was a routine three-foot-three fence shaped like the letter 'W'.

On May 27, 1995, Reeve's horse made a refusal. Witnesses said the horse began the third fence jump and suddenly stopped. Reeve fell forward off the horse, holding on to the reins. His hands became tangled in them, and the bridle and bit were pulled off the horse. He landed head first on the far side of the fence, shattering his first and second vertebrae. The resulting cervical spinal injury paralyzed him from the neck down and halted his breathing. Paramedics arrived three minutes later and immediately took measures to get air into his lungs. He was taken first to the local hospital, before being flown by helicopter to the University of Virginia Medical Center. He had no recollection of the accident.

Hospitalization
After five days in which Reeve was heavily medicated and delirious, he regained full consciousness. His doctor explained to him his first and second cervical vertebrae had been destroyed and his spinal cord damaged. He was paralyzed from the neck down and unable to breathe without a ventilator, but had not sustained any brain damage.

Reeve's first thoughts when informed about the seriousness of his injury was he had ruined his life, would be a burden on his family, and it might be best to "slip away". He mouthed to his wife Dana, "Maybe we should let me go." She tearfully replied, "I will support whatever you want to do, because this is your life and your decision. But I want you to know that I'll be with you for the long haul, no matter what. You're still you. And I love you." In what she would later describe as a "sales ploy", she also told him that if he still wanted to die in two years they could reconsider the question.

After this conversation, and visits from his children in which he saw how much they needed him, Reeve consented to lifesaving surgery and to treatment for pneumonia. He never considered suicide as an option again.

Reeve went through inner anguish in the ICU, particularly when he was alone during the night. His approaching operation to reattach his skull to his spine in June 1995 "was frightening to contemplate. ... I already knew that I had only a fifty-fifty chance of surviving the surgery. ... Then, at an especially bleak moment, the door flew open and in hurried a squat fellow with a blue scrub hat and a yellow surgical gown and glasses, speaking in a Russian accent." The man announced that he was a proctologist and was going to perform a rectal exam on Reeve. It was Robin Williams, reprising his character from the film Nine Months. Reeve wrote: "For the first time since the accident, I laughed. My old friend had helped me know that somehow I was going to be okay." In addition to visits from friends and family, Reeve received over 400,000 letters from all over the world, which gave him great comfort during his recovery.

Dr. John A. Jane performed surgery to repair Reeve's neck vertebrae. He put wires underneath both laminae and used bone from Reeve's hip to fit between the C1 and C2 vertebrae. He inserted a titanium pin and fused the wires with the vertebrae, then drilled holes in Reeve's skull and fitted the wires through to secure the skull to the spinal column.

Rehabilitation
After a month in the hospital, Reeve spent five months at the Kessler Rehabilitation Center in West Orange, New Jersey to continue with his recovery and learn skills such as operating his electric sip-and-puff wheelchair by blowing air through a straw. In his autobiography Still Me, he described initially not wanting to face the reality of his new disability. Getting used to sitting strapped into a wheelchair, or taking a shower, were initially terrifying. Reeve developed a deep fondness for many of the staff at Kessler, and through conversations with the other patients gradually started to see himself as being part of the disabled community.

For the first few months after the accident, Reeve relied on a ventilator, which was connected to his neck through a tracheostomy tube, for every breath. With therapy and practice, he developed the ability to breathe on his own for up to 90 minutes at a time.

Reeve exercised for up to four or five hours a day, using specialized exercise machines to stimulate his muscles and prevent muscle atrophy and osteoporosis. He believed that intense physical therapy could regenerate the nervous system, and also wanted his body to be strong enough to support itself if a cure for paralysis were found. Starting in 2000, he started to regain the ability to make small movements in his fingers and other parts of his body, and by 2002 reported that he could sense hot and cold temperatures on 65% of his body. Reeve's doctors were shocked by his improvements, which they attributed to his intensive exercise regimen.

Life with paralysis
In December 1995, Reeve moved back to his home in Pound Ridge, New York. By two years after the accident, Reeve said he was "glad to be alive, not out of obligation to others, but because life was worth living". Reeve continued to require round-the-clock care for the rest of his life, with a team of ten nurses and aides working in his home.

In the aftermath of the accident, Reeve went through intense grief. He gradually resolved to make the best of his new life, with a busy schedule of activism, film work, writing and promoting his books, public speaking, and parenting. In 1998, he said in an interview:Who knows why an accident happens? The key is what do you do afterwards. There is a period of shock and then grieving with confusion and loss. After that, you have two choices. One is to stare out the window and gradually disintegrate. And the other is to mobilize and use all your resources, whatever they may be, to do something positive. That is the road I have taken. It comes naturally to me. I am a competitive person and right now I am competing against decay. I don't want osteoporosis or muscle atrophy or depression to beat me.In another interview, Reeve said he drew on the self-discipline he had gained in his early years in the theater:Nobody wants another actor. There's too many of them now already... To keep believing in yourself in spite of those kinds of obstacles is certainly good preparation for what I'm going through now.

Religious views
For most of his life, Reeve did not identify with any religion. He attended his stepfather's Presbyterian church as a young teenager. In 1975, he briefly explored Scientology but opted out of becoming a member. He subsequently voiced criticism of the organization.

Reeve described his wedding in 1992 as his "first act of faith". After his accident, many well-wishers suggested that prayer would make him feel better, but he did not find it helpful. "I wondered what was wrong with me", he later wrote. "I had broken my neck and become paralyzed, possibly forever, but still hadn't found God."

In his 2002 book Nothing is Impossible: Reflections on a New Life, Reeve said that he and his wife had regularly attended Unitarian services, starting in his late forties. In the years following the accident, he had gradually come to believe that:Spirituality is found in the way we live our daily lives. It means spending time thinking about others. It's not so hard to imagine that there is some kind of higher power. We don't have to know what form it takes or exactly where it exists; just to honor it and try to live by it is enough... As these thoughts unfolded in the process of learning to live my new life, I had no idea that I was becoming a Unitarian.

Activism
In the 1980s, Reeve campaigned for Senator Patrick Leahy and made speeches throughout the state. He served as a board member for the Charles Lindbergh Fund, which promotes environmentally safe technologies. He lent support to causes such as Amnesty International, the Natural Resources Defense Council, and People for the American Way. As a pilot with the Environmental Air Force he gave government officials and journalists aerial tours over areas of environmental damage.

In late 1987, in Santiago, Chile, the country's dictator, Augusto Pinochet, threatened to execute 77 actors. Ariel Dorfman asked Reeve to help save their lives. Reeve flew to Chile and helped lead a protest march. A cartoon then ran in a newspaper showing him carrying Pinochet by the collar with the caption, "Where will you take him, Superman?" For his contribution to the protest, he was awarded the Grand Cross of the Bernardo O'Higgins Order, the highest Chilean distinction for foreigners. He also received an Obie Award and the Annual Walter Brielh Human Rights Foundation award.

In 1989, Reeve's friend Ron Silver started the Creative Coalition, a liberal organization aiming to teach celebrities how to speak knowledgeably about political issues. Reeve was an early member of the group, along with Susan Sarandon, Alec Baldwin, and Blythe Danner. The group's initiatives included environmental issues and defending the National Endowment of the Arts, which was under attack from conservative Republicans who objected to taxpayer-funding of art they considered offensive. Reeve was elected as a co-president of the Creative Coalition in 1994. The organization's work was noticed nationwide, and the Democratic Party asked Reeve to run for the United States Congress. He replied, "Run for Congress? And lose my influence in Washington?"

In 1996, ten months after the injury paralyzed him, Reeve appeared at the 68th Academy Awards to a long standing ovation. He used the occasion to encourage Hollywood to make more films on social issues, saying, "Let's continue to take risks. Let's tackle the issues. In many ways our film community can do it better than anyone else."

Disability activism

Reeve left the Kessler Rehabilitation Center feeling inspiration from the other patients he had met. Because the media was constantly covering him, he decided to use his name to put focus on spinal cord injuries. In 1996, he also hosted the Paralympics in Atlanta and spoke at the Democratic National Convention. He traveled across the country to make speeches. For these efforts, he was placed on the cover of Time on August 26, 1996.

Reeve's first effort to change disability legislation was in supporting a 1997 bill would raise the lifetime "cap" on insurance payments from the standard $1 million to $10 million per person. For catastrophically injured people with one insurance policy, the $1 million limit often lasts just a few years. The bill was narrowly defeated. In 1999, he supported the Work Incentives Improvement Act, which allows people to continue to receive disability benefits after they return to work. This bill passed.

Reeve was elected chairman of the American Paralysis Association (now Christopher and Dana Reeve Foundation) and vice chairman of the National Organization on Disability. With Joan Irvine Smith, he co-founded the Reeve-Irvine Research Center, which is now one of the leading spinal cord research centers in the world. In 1999, the American Paralysis Association and another foundation Reeve had founded were merged into the Christopher Reeve Foundation, which aims to speed up research through funding and to use grants to improve the quality of the lives of people with disabilities. The Foundation to date has given more than $65 million to research and more than $8.5 million in quality-of-life grants. Of Christopher Reeve, UC Irvine said, "in the years following his injury, Christopher did more to promote research on spinal cord injury and other neurological disorders than any other person before or since".

Reeve served as a board member for several organizations aim to improve quality of life for people with disabilities.

Reeve lobbied for expanded federal funding on embryonic stem cell research to include all embryonic stem cell lines in existence and for self-governance to make open-ended scientific inquiry of the research. President George W. Bush limited the federal funding to research only on human embryonic stem cell lines created on or before August 9, 2001, the day he announced his policy, and allotted approximately $100 million for it. Reeve initially called this "a step in the right direction", admitting he did not know about the existing lines and would look into them further. He fought against the limit when scientists revealed an early research technique involved mixing the human stem cells with mouse cells contaminated most of the old lines.

In 2002, Reeve lobbied for the Human Cloning Prohibition Act of 2001, which would allow somatic cell nuclear transfer research, but would ban reproductive cloning. He argued stem cell implantation is unsafe unless the stem cells contain the patient's own DNA and because somatic cell nuclear transfer is done without fertilizing an egg, it can be fully regulated. In June 2004, Reeve provided a videotaped message on behalf of the Genetics Policy Institute to the delegates of the United Nations in defense of somatic cell nuclear transfer, which a world treaty was considering banning. In the final days of his life, Reeve urged California voters to vote yes on Proposition 71, which would establish the California Institute for Regenerative Medicine and would allot $3 billion of state funds to stem cell research. Proposition 71 was approved less than one month after Reeve's death.

In July 2003, Christopher Reeve's continuing frustration with the pace of stem cell research in the U.S. led him to Israel, a country that was then, according to him, at the center of research in spinal cord injury. Israel's Ministry of Foreign Affairs invited him to seek out the best treatment for his condition. During his visit, Reeve called the experience "a privilege" and said, "Israel has very proactive rehab facilities, excellent medical schools and teaching hospitals, and an absolutely first-rate research infrastructure." Israelis were very receptive to Reeve's visit, calling him an inspiration to all and urging him never to give up hope.

Health problems and death
Reeve had asthma and allergies since childhood. At age 16, he began to experience alopecia areata, a condition that causes patches of hair to fall out from an otherwise healthy head of hair. Generally, he was able to comb it over and often the problem disappeared for long periods, but he wore a wig for the third and fourth Superman films. The condition became more noticeable after he became paralyzed, after which he started having his head shaved.

More than once he had a severe reaction to a drug. In Kessler, he tried a drug named Sygen  which was theorized to help reduce damage to the spinal cord. The drug caused him to go into anaphylactic shock, and his heart stopped. He claimed to have had an out-of-body experience and remembered saying, "I'm sorry, but I have to go now", during the event. In his autobiography, he wrote, "and then I left my body. I was up on the ceiling... I looked down and saw my body stretched out on the bed, not moving, while everybody—there were 15 or 20 people, the doctors, the EMTs, the nurses—was working on me. The noise and commotion grew quieter as though someone were gradually turning down the volume." After receiving a large dose of epinephrine, he woke up and stabilized later that night.

In 2002 and 2004, Reeve survived several serious infections believed to have originated from his bone marrow. He recovered from three that could have been fatal.

In early October 2004, he was being treated for an infected pressure ulcer that was causing sepsis, a complication he had experienced many times before. On October 4, 2004, he spoke at the Rehabilitation Institute of Chicago on behalf of the institute's work; it was his last reported public appearance. On October 9, 2004, Reeve attended his son Will's hockey game. That night, he went into cardiac arrest after receiving an antibiotic for the infection. He fell into a coma, and was taken to Northern Westchester Hospital in Mount Kisco, New York. Eighteen hours later, on October 10, 2004, Reeve died at the age of 52. No official autopsy was performed on the actor. However, both Reeve's wife Dana and his doctor John McDonald believed that an adverse reaction to a drug caused Reeve's death.

Funeral
His remains were cremated at Ferncliff Cemetery. His ashes were sprinkled in the wind by his family. A memorial service for Reeve was held at the Unitarian Church in Westport, Connecticut, which both Reeve and Dana had attended. Another private memorial service held at the Juilliard School three weeks later was attended by more than 900 people, with speakers.

Legacy
Reeve's widow, Dana Reeve, headed the Christopher Reeve Foundation after his death. Although a non-smoker, she was diagnosed with lung cancer on August 9, 2005. She died at age 44 on March 6, 2006, and the foundation was subsequently renamed the Christopher and Dana Reeve Foundation.

Reeve's children Matthew, Alexandra, and William all serve on the board of directors for the Christopher and Dana Reeve Foundation, while Will is also a reporter for ABC News. In 2015, Alexandra and her husband welcomed a son, Christopher Russel Reeve Givens.

Google Search showed a Doodle in some countries on September 25, 2021, to celebrate Christopher Reeve's 69th birthday.

Filmography

See also
 Superman curse

References

Bibliography
 Reeve, Christopher Nothing is Impossible, Random House, 2002. 
 Reeve, Christopher. Still Me, Random House, 1998.

External links
 
 
 
 
 "Christopher Reeve, 'Superman' and Crusader for Stem Cells, Dies". New York Times. October 11, 2004
 Christopher and Dana Reeve Foundation
 Political Cartoons Honoring Reeve
 Christopher Reeve reads from "Discover Yourself" and "The Secret Path"
 Christopher Reeve Interview at Texas Archive of the Moving Image

1952 births
2004 deaths
20th-century American male actors
20th-century Unitarians
21st-century American male actors
21st-century Unitarians
Actors with disabilities
American environmentalists
American male equestrians
American male film actors
American male soap opera actors
American male stage actors
American people of English descent
American people of French descent
American people with disabilities
American Unitarian Universalists
Audiobook narrators
BAFTA Most Promising Newcomer to Leading Film Roles winners
Cornell University alumni
Critics of Scientology
Deaths from sepsis
Emmy Award winners
Former Presbyterians
Glider pilots
Grammy Award winners
Horse-related accidents and incidents
Infectious disease deaths in New York (state)
Juilliard School alumni
Male actors from New York City
New Jersey Hall of Fame inductees
New York (state) Democrats
Outstanding Performance by a Male Actor in a Miniseries or Television Movie Screen Actors Guild Award winners
People from Pound Ridge, New York
People from Princeton, New Jersey
People with tetraplegia
Princeton Day School alumni
Wheelchair users
Winthrop family
Woolsey family